In mathematics, specifically in category theory, a quasi-abelian category is a pre-abelian category in which the pushout of a kernel along arbitrary morphisms is again a kernel and, dually, the pullback of a cokernel along arbitrary morphisms is again a cokernel.

Definition

Let  be a pre-abelian category. The category  is quasi-abelian if for every kernel  and every morphism  in the pushout diagram

the morphism  is again a kernel and, dually, for every cokernel  and every morphism  in the pullback diagram

the morphism  is again a cokernel.

Equivalently, a quasi-abelian category is a pre-abelian category in which the system of all kernel-cokernel pairs forms an exact structure.

Given a pre-abelian category, those kernels, which are stable under arbitrary pushouts, are sometimes called the semi-stable kernels. Dually, cokernels, which are stable under arbitrary pullbacks, are called semi-stable cokernels.

Properties

Let   be a morphism in a quasi-abelian category. Then the induced morphism  is always a bimorphism, i.e., a monomorphism and an epimorphism. A quasi-abelian category is therefore always semi-abelian.

Examples

Every abelian category is quasi-abelian. Typical non-abelian examples arise in functional analysis.

 The category of Banach spaces is quasi-abelian.
 The category of Fréchet spaces is quasi-abelian.
 The category of (Hausdorff) locally convex spaces is quasi-abelian.

History

The concept of quasi-abelian category was developed in the 1960s. The history is involved. This is in particular due to Raikov's conjecture, which stated that the notion of a semi-abelian category is equivalent to that of a quasi-abelian category. Around 2005 it turned out that the conjecture is false.

Left and right quasi-abelian categories

By dividing the two conditions in the definition, one can define left quasi-abelian categories by requiring that cokernels are stable under pullbacks and right quasi-abelian categories by requiring that kernels stable under pushouts.

Citations

References 

 Fabienne Prosmans, Derived categories for functional analysis. Publ. Res. Inst. Math. Sci. 36(5–6), 19–83 (2000).
 Fred Richman and Elbert A. Walker, Ext in pre-Abelian categories. Pac. J. Math. 71(2), 521–535 (1977).
 Wolfgang Rump, A counterexample to Raikov's conjecture, Bull. London Math. Soc. 40, 985–994 (2008).
 Wolfgang Rump, Almost abelian categories, Cahiers Topologie Géom. Différentielle Catég. 42(3), 163–225 (2001).
 Wolfgang Rump, Analysis of a problem of Raikov with applications to barreled and bornological spaces, J. Pure and Appl. Algebra 215, 44–52 (2011).
 Jean Pierre Schneiders, Quasi-abelian categories and sheaves, Mém. Soc. Math. Fr. Nouv. Sér. 76 (1999).

Additive categories